Red Slate Mountain is a summit in the Sierra Nevada. It lies along the Sierra Crest that divides Fresno County from Mono County, California.

Red Slate Mountain can be reached by scrambling either from McGee Pass, or starting from Bighorn Lake.

The area to the north of Red Slate Mountain is among the most seismically active in California which is associated with the Long Valley Caldera.

Red Slate Mountain was named by the California Geological Survey, in 1873. However, it is not clear whether the survey meant to name this peak, or Red and White Mountain.

See also
List of mountain peaks of California

References

External links

Mountains of Mono County, California
Mountains of Fresno County, California
Mountains of the John Muir Wilderness
North American 4000 m summits
Mountains of Northern California